Mata Palacio is a town in the Hato Mayor province of the Dominican Republic.

Sources 
 – World-Gazetteer.com

Populated places in Hato Mayor Province